Charles Richard Bates (born October 7, 1945) is an American former Major League Baseball right-handed pitcher. He graduated from McArthur (OH) High School now Vinton County High School and was signed by the Kansas City Athletics as an undrafted free agent before the  season. After that, Bates also spent time in the Washington Senators organization, and was later drafted by the Seattle Pilots as the 30th pick in the 1968 expansion draft.

Bates' major league tenure consisted of one relief appearance for the expansion Pilots, against the Oakland Athletics (April 27, 1969 at Sick's Stadium). Bates allowed six baserunners (three hits, three walks) and five earned runs along with three strikeouts in  innings, and ended up with a 27.00 ERA.

As of 2006, Bates was living in Glendale, Arizona, and working as the general manager of the Arizona Biltmore Golf & Country Club in nearby Phoenix.

References

External links

Retrosheet

1945 births
Living people
Major League Baseball pitchers
Baseball players from Ohio
Seattle Pilots players
Portland Beavers players
Vancouver Mounties players
York White Roses players
Wytheville A's players
Jacksonville Suns players
Savannah Senators players
Burlington Senators players
Geneva Senators players
People from McArthur, Ohio